Green seniors refers to elderly or retired people who have an active interest in environmental issues.

The term is believed to have first been publicly used by the European Green Party in the 2005 Declaration of Brussels, and has been subsequently discussed by various Green Parties in Europe without wider uptake as a generic term.

The demographics of the modern environmental movement tend to be skewed towards younger people (sometimes referred to as "Generation Y"; with the exception of a smaller number of "elder statespersons" who were involved in the birth of the modern environmental movement. This is demonstrated clearly in the membership profiles of organisations such as Greenpeace, Rainforest Action Network and People & Planet, who all classify themselves as Direct Action groups.

A website called Green Seniors was launched in 2006 to attempt to give the term wider currency and provide a portal specifically for older people to access information and find environmental organisation and campaigns.

References

External links 
European Network Of Green Seniors 
Green Seniors 

Environmentalism
Seniors' organizations